KSQS (91.7 FM) is a radio station broadcasting a Contemporary Christian format. Licensed to Ririe, Idaho, United States, the station serves the Idaho Falls area. The station is currently owned by Faith Communications Corp.

History
The station went on the air as KSQS on 1998-12-15.

References

External links

Radio stations established in 1998
SQS